Louise Saunders (1893–1969)  was a lawyer who was called to the bar in 1933 and went on to become the first woman lawyer in Newfoundland.  She began her career as a legal secretary in the office of Richard Squires who was Prime Minister of Newfoundland during the 1920s.

Saunders was born in Greenspond and died in St. John's.

See also 
 First woman lawyers around the world

References 

1893 births
1969 deaths
Canadian women lawyers
Lawyers in Newfoundland and Labrador
People from Newfoundland (island)
20th-century women lawyers
Dominion of Newfoundland people